Lethal injection is the practice of injecting one or more drugs into a person (typically a barbiturate, paralytic, and potassium solution) for the express purpose of causing rapid death. The main application for this procedure is capital punishment, but the term may also be applied in a broader sense to include euthanasia and other forms of suicide. The drugs cause the person to become unconscious, stops their breathing, and causes a heart arrhythmia, in that order.

First developed in the United States, it has become a legal means of execution in Mainland China, Thailand (since 2003), Guatemala, Taiwan, the Maldives, Nigeria, and Vietnam, though Guatemala abolished the death penalty in civil cases in 2017 and has not conducted an execution since 2000 and the Maldives has never carried out an execution since its independence. Although Taiwan permits lethal injection as an execution method, no executions have been carried out in this manner; the same is true for Nigeria. Lethal injection was also used in the Philippines until the country re-abolished the death penalty in 2006.

Although primarily introduced as a more "humane" method of execution, lethal injection has been subject to criticism, being described by some as cruel and unusual. Opponents in particular critique the operation of lethal injections by untrained corrections officers (as anyone even remotely medically trained is prohibited by the Hippocratic oath), and the lack of guarantee that the victim will be unconscious in every individual case. There have been instances in which condemned individuals have been injected with paralytics, and then a cardiac arrest-inducing agent, while still conscious; this has been compared to torture. Proponents often say that there is no reasonable or less cruel alternative.

History
Lethal injection gained popularity in the late 20th century as a form of execution intended to supplant other methods, notably electrocution, gas inhalation, hanging and firing squad, that were considered to be less humane. It is now the most common form of legal execution in the United States.

Lethal injection was proposed on January 17, 1888, by Julius Mount Bleyer, a New York doctor who praised it as being cheaper than hanging. Bleyer's idea was never used, due to a series of botched executions and the eventual rise of public disapproval in electrocutions. Lethal injections were first used by Nazi Germany to execute prisoners during World War II. Nazi Germany developed the Action T4 euthanasia program led by Karl Brandt as one method to dispose of Lebensunwertes Leben ("life unworthy of life"). During the war, lethal injections were also administered to children detained at the Sisak concentration camp by the camp's commander, the physician Antun Najžer. The British Royal Commission on Capital Punishment (1949–53) also considered lethal injection, but eventually ruled it out after pressure from the British Medical Association (BMA).

Implementation
On May 11, 1977, Oklahoma's state medical examiner Jay Chapman proposed a new, less painful method of execution, known as Chapman's protocol: "An intravenous saline drip shall be started in the prisoner's arm, into which shall be introduced a lethal injection consisting of an ultrashort-acting barbiturate in combination with a chemical paralytic." After the procedure was approved by anesthesiologist Stanley Deutsch, formerly Head of the Department of Anaesthesiology of the Oklahoma University Medical School, the Episcopal Reverend Bill Wiseman introduced the method into the Oklahoma legislature, where it passed and was quickly adopted (Title 22, Section 1014(A)). Since then, until 2004, 37 of the 38 states using capital punishment introduced lethal injection statutes (the last state, Nebraska, maintaining electrocution as its single method until adopting injection in 2009, after its Supreme Court deemed the electric chair unconstitutional).

On August 29, 1977, Texas adopted the new method of execution, switching from electrocution. On December 7, 1982, Texas became the first U.S. state and territory in the world to use lethal injection to carry out capital punishment, for the execution of Charles Brooks, Jr.

The People's Republic of China began using this method in 1997, Guatemala in 1996, the Philippines in 1999, Thailand in 2003, and Taiwan in 2005. Vietnam first used this method in 2013. The Philippines abolished the death penalty in 2006, with their last execution being in 2000. Guatemalan law still allows for the death penalty and lethal injection is the sole method allowed, but no penalties have been carried out since 2000 when the country experienced the live televised double executions of Amilcar Cetino Perez and Tomas Cerrate Hernandez.

The export of drugs to be used for lethal injection was banned by the European Union (EU) in 2011, together with other items under the EU Torture Regulation. Since then, pentobarbital followed thiopental in the European Union's ban.

Complications of executions and cessation of supply of lethal injection drugs
By early 2014, a number of botched executions involving lethal injection, and a rising shortage of suitable drugs, had some U.S. states reconsidering lethal injection as a form of execution. Tennessee, which had previously offered inmates a choice between lethal injection and the electric chair, passed a law in May 2014 which gave the state the option to use the electric chair if lethal injection drugs are either unavailable or declared unconstitutional. At the same time, Wyoming and Utah were considering the use of execution by firing squad in addition to other existing execution methods.

In 2016, Pfizer joined over 20 American and European pharmaceutical manufacturers that had previously blocked the sale of their drugs for use in lethal injections, effectively closing the open market for FDA-approved manufacturers for any potential lethal execution drug. In the execution of Carey Dean Moore on August 14, 2018, the State of Nebraska used a novel drug cocktail comprising diazepam, fentanyl, cisatracurium, and potassium chloride, over the strong objections of the German pharmaceutical company Fresenius Kabi.

Potassium acetate had been incorrectly used in place of potassium chloride in Oklahoma in January 2015 for the execution of Charles Frederick Warner. In August 2017, the State of Florida first used the drug in the execution of Mark James Asay using a combination of etomidate, rocuronium bromide, and potassium acetate as part of a new protocol.

Procedures

Procedure in the United States
In the United States, the typical lethal injection begins with the condemned person being strapped onto a gurney; two intravenous cannulas ("IVs") are then inserted, one in each arm. Only one is necessary to carry out the execution; the other is reserved as a backup in the event the primary line fails. A line leading from the IV line in an adjacent room is attached to the prisoner's IV and secured so that the line does not snap during the injections.

The arm of the condemned person is swabbed with alcohol before the cannula is inserted. The needles and equipment used are sterilized. Questions have been raised about why these precautions against infection are performed despite the purpose of the injection being death. The several explanations include: cannulae are sterilized and have their quality heavily controlled during manufacture, so using sterile ones is a routine medical procedure. Secondly, the prisoner could receive a stay of execution after the cannulae have been inserted, as happened in the case of James Autry in October 1983 (he was eventually executed on March 14, 1984). Third, use of unsterilized equipment would be a hazard to the prison personnel in case of an accidental needle stick.

Following connection of the lines, saline drips are started in both arms. This, too, is standard medical procedure: it must be ascertained that the IV lines are not blocked, ensuring the chemicals have not precipitated in the IV lines and blocked the needle, preventing the drugs from reaching the subject. A heart monitor is attached to the inmate.

In most states, the intravenous injection is a series of drugs given in a set sequence, designed to first induce unconsciousness followed by death through paralysis of respiratory muscles and/or by cardiac arrest through depolarization of cardiac muscle cells. The execution of the condemned in most states involves three separate injections (in sequential order):
Sodium thiopental or pentobarbital: ultra-short-action barbiturate, an anesthetic agent used at a high dose that renders the person unconscious in less than 30 seconds. Depression of respiratory activity is one of the characteristic actions of this drug. Consequently, the lethal-injection doses, as described in the Sodium Thiopental section below, will—even in the absence of the following two drugs—cause death due to lack of breathing, as happens with overdoses of opioids.
Pancuronium bromide: non-depolarizing muscle relaxant, which causes complete, fast, and sustained paralysis of the striated skeletal muscles, including the diaphragm and the rest of the respiratory muscles; this would eventually cause death by asphyxiation.
Potassium chloride: a potassium salt, which increases the blood and cardiac concentration of potassium to stop the heart via an abnormal heartbeat and thus cause death by cardiac arrest.

The drugs are not mixed externally to avoid precipitation. A sequential injection is also key to achieve the desired effects in the appropriate order: administration of the pentobarbital renders the person unconscious; the infusion of the pancuronium bromide induces complete paralysis, including that of the lungs and diaphragm rendering the person unable to breathe.

If the person being executed were not already completely unconscious, the injection of a highly concentrated solution of potassium chloride could cause severe pain at the site of the IV line, as well as along the punctured vein; it interrupts the electrical activity of the heart muscle and causes it to stop beating, bringing about the death of the person being executed.

The intravenous tubing leads to a room next to the execution chamber, usually separated from the condemned by a curtain or wall. Typically, a prison employee trained in venipuncture inserts the needle, while a second prison employee orders, prepares, and loads the drugs into the lethal injection syringes. Two other staff members take each of the three syringes and secure them into the IVs. After the curtain is opened to allow the witnesses to see inside the chamber, the condemned person is then permitted to make a final statement. During the execution, the condemned's cardiac rhythm is monitored.

Death is pronounced after cardiac activity stops. Death usually occurs within seven minutes, although, due to complications in finding a suitable vein, the whole procedure can take up to two hours, as was the case with the execution of Christopher Newton on May 24, 2007. According to state law, if a physician's participation in the execution is prohibited for reasons of medical ethics, then the death ruling can be made by the state medical examiner's office. After confirmation that death has occurred, a coroner signs the condemned's death certificate.

Missouri and, before the abolition of capital punishment, Delaware, uses or used a lethal injection machine designed by Massachusetts-based Fred A. Leuchter consisting of two components: the delivery module and the control module. The delivery module is in the execution chamber. It must be pre-loaded with the proper chemicals and operates the timing of the dosage. The control module is in the control room. This is the portion which officially starts the procedure. This is done by first arming the machine, and then with station members simultaneously pressing each of their buttons on the panel to activate the delivery. The computer then deletes who actually started the syringes, so the participants are not aware if their syringe contained saline or one of the drugs necessary for execution (to assuage guilt in a manner similar to the blank cartridge in execution by firing squad).

The delivery module has eight syringes. The end syringes (i.e., syringes 7 and 8) containing saline, syringes 2, 4 and 6 containing the lethal drugs for the main line and syringes 1, 3 and 5 containing the injections for the backup line. The system was used in New Jersey before the abolition of the death penalty in 2007. Illinois previously used the computer, and Missouri and Delaware use the manual injection switch on the delivery panel.

Eleven states have switched, or have stated their intention to switch, to a one-drug lethal injection protocol. A one-drug method is using the single drug sodium thiopental to execute someone. The first state to switch to this method was Ohio, on December 8, 2009.

In 2011, after pressure by activist organizations, the manufacturers of pentobarbital and sodium thiopental halted the supply of the drugs to U.S. prisons performing lethal injections and required all resellers to do the same.

Procedure in China

In the past, the People's Republic of China executed prisoners primarily by means of shooting. In recent years, lethal injection has become more common. The specific lethal injection procedures, including the drug or drugs used, are a state secret and not publicly known.

Lethal injection in China was legalized in 1996. The number of shooting executions slowly decreased; and, in February 2009, the Supreme People's Court ordered the discontinuation of firing squads by the following year under the conclusion that injections were more humane to the prisoner. It has been suggested that the switch is also in response to executions being horrifying to the public. Lethal injections are less expensive than firing squads, with a single dose costing 300 yuan compared to 700 yuan for a shooting execution.

Procedure in Vietnam
Prior to 2013, shooting was the primary method of execution in Vietnam. The use of lethal injection method was approved by the government in 2010, adopted in 2011, and then started being used in 2013. Urges to adopt other methods than lethal injection to replace the shooting execution began earlier, in 2006, after concerns of the mental state of the firing squad members after executions.

The drugs used consist of pancuronium bromide (paralyzing substance), potassium chloride (stops cardiac activity), and sodium thiopental (anesthetic). The production of these substances, however, is low in Vietnam. This led to drug shortages and to considering using other domestic poisons or the readoption of shootings.

The first prisoner in Vietnam to be executed by lethal injection, on August 6, 2013, was the 27-year-old man Nguyen Anh Tuan, arrested for murder and robbery. Between 2013 and 2016, 429 prisoners were executed by this method in the country.

Drugs

Conventional lethal injection protocol
Typically, three drugs are used in lethal injection. Pancuronium bromide (Pavulon) is used to cause muscle paralysis and respiratory arrest, potassium chloride to stop the heart, and midazolam for sedation.

Pancuronium bromide (Pavulon)

Lethal injection dosage: 100 milligrams

Pancuronium bromide (Trade name: Pavulon): The related drug curare, like pancuronium, is a non-depolarizing muscle relaxant (a paralytic agent) that blocks the action of acetylcholine at the motor end-plate of the neuromuscular junction. Binding of acetylcholine to receptors on the end-plate causes depolarization and contraction of the muscle fiber; non-depolarizing neuromuscular blocking agents like pancuronium stop this binding from taking place

The typical dose for pancuronium bromide in capital punishment by lethal injection is 0.2 mg/kg and the duration of paralysis is around 4 to 8 hours. Paralysis of respiratory muscles will lead to death in a considerably shorter time.

Other drugs in use are succinylcholine chloride and tubocurarine chloride.

Pancuronium bromide is a derivative of the alkaloid malouetine from the plant Malouetia bequaertiana.

Potassium chloride

Lethal injection dosage: 100 mEq (milliequivalents)

Potassium is an electrolyte, 98% of which is intracellular. The 2% remaining outside the cell has great implications for cells that generate action potentials. Doctors prescribe potassium for patients when potassium levels in the blood are insufficient, called hypokalemia. The potassium can be given orally, which is the safest route; or it can be given intravenously, in which case strict rules and hospital protocols govern the rate at which it is given.

The usual intravenous dose is 10–20 mEq per hour and it is given slowly since it takes time for the electrolyte to equilibrate into the cells. When used in state-sanctioned lethal injection, bolus potassium injection affects the electrical conduction of heart muscle. Elevated potassium, or hyperkalemia, causes the resting electrical potential of the heart muscle cells to be lower than normal (less negative) and more depolarised than normal at rest. The sodium voltage-gated channels required for the rapid phase 0 depolarisation spike in the ventricular and atrial action potential can fire once, but will inactivate rapidly and become inexcitable due to the closure of a specific inactivation gate. This blockage would normally be removed from the pore when the membrane repolarises to more than −70mV however as there is a raised resting membrane potential this negative membrane potential cannot be reached and the inactivation of the sodium voltage-gated channels cannot be relieved. Thus there can be no subsequent action potentials generated within the affected sarcomere.

Depolarizing the muscle cell inhibits its ability to fire by reducing the available number of sodium channels (they are placed in an inactivated state). ECG changes include faster repolarization (peaked T-waves), PR interval prolongation, widening of the QRS complex, and finally, asystole. Cases of patients dying from hyperkalemia (usually secondary to kidney failure) are well known in the medical community, where patients have been known to die very rapidly, having previously seemed to be normal.

Sodium thiopental

Lethal injection dosage: 2–5 grams

Sodium thiopental (US trade name: Sodium Pentothal) is an ultra-short acting barbiturate, often used for anesthesia induction and for medically-induced coma. The typical anesthesia induction dose is 0.35 grams. Loss of consciousness is induced within 30–45 seconds at the typical dose, while a 5 gram dose (14 times the normal dose) is likely to induce unconsciousness in 10 seconds.

A full medical dose of thiopental reaches the brain in about 30 seconds. This induces an unconscious state. Five to twenty minutes after injection, approximately 15% of the drug is in the brain, with the rest in other parts of the body.

The half-life of this drug is about 11.5 hours, and the concentration in the brain remains at around 5–10% of the total dose during that time. When a 'mega-dose' is administered, as in state-sanctioned lethal injection, the concentration in the brain during the tail phase of the distribution remains higher than the peak concentration found in the induction dose for anesthesia, because repeated doses—or a single very high dose as in lethal injection—accumulate in high concentrations in body fat, from which the thiopental is gradually released. This is the reason why an ultra-short acting barbiturate, such as thiopental, can be used for long-term induction of medical coma.

Historically, thiopental has been one of the most commonly used and studied drugs for the induction of coma. Protocols vary for how it is given, but the typical doses are anywhere from 500 mg up to 1.5 grams. It is likely that this data was used to develop the initial protocols for state-sanctioned lethal injection, according to which one gram of thiopental was used to induce the coma. Now, most states use 5 grams to be absolutely certain the dosage is effective.

Pentobarbital was introduced at the end of 2010 due to a shortage of sodium thiopental, and has since become the primary sedative in lethal injections in the United States.

Barbiturates are the same class of drug used in medically assisted suicide. In euthanasia protocols, the typical dose of thiopental is 1.5 grams; the Dutch Euthanasia protocol indicates 1-1.5 grams or 2 grams in case of high barbiturate tolerance. The dose used for capital punishment is therefore about 3 times more than the dose used in euthanasia.

New lethal injection protocols
The Ohio protocol, developed after the incomplete execution of Romell Broom, ensures the rapid and painless onset of anesthesia by only using sodium thiopental and eliminating the use of Pavulon and potassium as the second and third drugs, respectively. It also provides for a secondary fail-safe measure using intramuscular injection of midazolam and hydromorphone in the event intravenous administration of the sodium thiopental proves problematic. The first state to switch to use midazolam as the first drug in a new three-drug protocol was Florida on October 15, 2013. Then on November 14, 2013, Ohio made the same move.

 Primary: Sodium thiopental, 5 grams, intravenous
 Secondary: Midazolam, 10 mg, intramuscular, and hydromorphone, 40 mg, intramuscular

In the brief for the U.S. courts written by accessories, the State of Ohio implies that they were unable to find any physicians willing to participate in development of protocols for executions by lethal injection, as this would be a violation of medical ethics, such as the Geneva Promise, and such physicians would be thrown out of the medical community and shunned for engaging in such deeds, even if they could not lawfully be stripped of their license.

On December 8, 2009, Kenneth Biros became the first person executed using Ohio's new single-drug execution protocol. He was pronounced dead at 11:47 am EST, 10 minutes after receiving the injection. On September 10, 2010, Washington became the second state to use the single-drug Ohio protocol with the execution of Cal Coburn Brown, who was proclaimed dead within two minutes after receiving the single-drug injection of sodium thiopental. Currently, seven states (Arizona, Georgia, Idaho, Missouri, Ohio, South Dakota, and Texas.) have used the single-drug execution protocol. The state of Washington did use this single drug method, but they have stopped since state executions were abolished. Five additional states (Arkansas, Kentucky, Louisiana, North Carolina, and Tennessee) have announced that they are switching to a single-drug protocol but, as of April 2014, have not executed anyone since switching protocols.

After sodium thiopental began being used in executions, Hospira, the only American company that made the drug, stopped manufacturing it due to its use in executions. The subsequent nationwide shortage of sodium thiopental led states to seek other drugs to use in executions. Pentobarbital, often used for animal euthanasia, was used as part of a three-drug cocktail for the first time on December 16, 2010, when John David Duty was executed in Oklahoma. It was then used as the drug in a single-drug execution for the first time on March 10, 2011, when Johnnie Baston was executed in Ohio.

Euthanasia protocol
Lethal injection has also been used in cases of euthanasia to facilitate voluntary death in patients with terminal or chronically painful conditions. Euthanasia can be accomplished either through oral, intravenous, or intramuscular administration of drugs. In individuals who are incapable of swallowing lethal doses of medication, an intravenous route is preferred. The following is a Dutch protocol for parenteral (intravenous) administration to obtain euthanasia, with the old protocol listed first and the new protocol listed second:

First a coma is induced by intravenous administration of 1 g sodium thiopental (Nesdonal), if necessary, 1.5–2.0 g of the product in case of strong tolerance to barbiturates. Then, 45 mg alcuronium chloride (Alloferin) or 18 mg pancuronium bromide (Pavulon) is injected. To ensure optimal availability, these agents are preferably given intravenously. However, they can also be injected intramuscularly. In severe hepatitis or cirrhosis of the liver, alcuronium is the agent of first choice.

Intravenous administration is the most reliable and rapid way to accomplish euthanasia, so can be safely recommended. A coma is first induced by intravenous administration of 20 mg/kg sodium thiopental in a small volume (10 ml physiological saline). Then, a triple intravenous dose of a nondepolarizing neuromuscular muscle relaxant is given, such as 20 mg pancuronium bromide or 20 mg vecuronium bromide (Norcuron). The muscle relaxant should preferably be given intravenously, to ensure optimal availability. Only for pancuronium dibromide, the agent may also be given intramuscularly in a dose of 40 mg.

A euthanasia machine may allow an individual to perform the process alone.

Constitutionality in the United States
In 2006, the Supreme Court ruled in Hill v. McDonough that death-row inmates in the United States could challenge the constitutionality of states' lethal injection procedures through a federal civil rights lawsuit. Since then, numerous death-row inmates have brought such challenges in the lower courts, claiming that lethal injection as currently practiced violates the ban on "cruel and unusual punishment" found in the Eighth Amendment to the United States Constitution. Lower courts evaluating these challenges have reached opposing conclusions. For example, courts have found that lethal injection as practiced in California, Florida, and Tennessee is unconstitutional. Other courts have found that lethal injection as practiced in Missouri, Arizona, and Oklahoma is constitutionally acceptable.

As of 2014, California has nearly 750 prisoners condemned to death by lethal injection despite the moratorium imposed when in 2006 a federal court found California's lethal injection procedures to be unconstitutional. A newer lethal injection facility has been constructed at San Quentin State Prison which cost over $800,000, but it has yet to be used because a state court found that the California Department of Corrections and Rehabilitation violated the California Administrative Procedure Act by attempting to prevent public oversight when new injection procedures were being created.

On September 25, 2007, the United States Supreme Court agreed to hear a lethal-injection challenge arising from Kentucky, Baze v. Rees. In Baze, the Supreme Court addressed whether Kentucky's particular lethal-injection procedure (using the standard three-drug protocol) comports with the Eighth Amendment; it also determined the proper legal standard by which lethal-injection challenges in general should be judged, all in an effort to bring some uniformity to how these claims are handled by the lower courts. Although uncertainty over whether executions in the United States would be put on hold during the period in which the United States Supreme Court considers the constitutionality of lethal injection initially arose after the court agreed to hear Baze, no executions took place during the period between when the court agreed to hear the case and when its ruling was announced, with the exception of one lethal injection in Texas hours after the court made its announcement.

On April 16, 2008, the Supreme Court rejected Baze v. Rees, thereby upholding Kentucky's method of lethal injection in a majority 7–2 decision. Justices Ruth Bader Ginsburg and David Souter dissented. Several states immediately indicated plans to proceed with executions.

The U.S. Supreme Court also upheld a modified lethal-injection protocol in the 2015 case Glossip v. Gross.  By the time of that case, Oklahoma had altered its execution protocol to use midazolam instead of thiopental or pentobarbital; the latter two drugs had become unavailable for executions due to the European embargo on selling them to prisons.  Inmates on Oklahoma's death row alleged that the use of midazolam was unconstitutional, because the drug was not proven to render a person unconscious as thiobarbital would. The Supreme Court found that the prisoners failed to demonstrate that midazolam would create a high risk of severe pain, and that the prisoners had not provided an alternative, practical method of execution that would have a lower risk.  Consequently, it ruled that the new method was permissible under the Eighth Amendment.

On March 15, 2018, Russell Bucklew, a Missouri death-row inmate who had been scheduled to be executed on May 21, 2014, appealed the constitutionality of lethal injection on an as-applied basis. The basis for Bucklew's appeal was due to Bucklew's allegation that his rare medical condition would interfere with the effects of the drugs, potentially causing him to choke on his own blood. On April 1, 2019, The Supreme Court ruled against Bucklew on the grounds that his proposed alternative to lethal injection, nitrogen hypoxia, was neither "readily implemented" nor established to "significantly reduce a substantial risk of severe pain".
 Bucklew was executed on October 1, 2019.

Ethics of lethal injection

The American Medical Association (AMA) believes that a physician's opinion on capital punishment is a personal decision. Since the AMA is founded on preserving life, they argue that a doctor "should not be a participant" in executions in any professional capacity with the exception of "certifying death, provided that the condemned has been declared dead by another person" and "relieving the acute suffering of a condemned person while awaiting execution". The AMA, however, does not have the ability to enforce its prohibition of doctors from participation in lethal injection. As medical licensing is handled on the state level, it does not have the authority to revoke medical licenses.

Typically, most states do not require that physicians administer the drugs for lethal injection, but most states do require doctors, nurses or paramedics to prepare the substances before their application and to attest the inmate's death after it.

Some states specifically detail that participation in a lethal injection is not to be considered practicing medicine. For example, Delaware law reads "the administration of the required lethal substance or substances required by this section shall not be construed to be the practice of medicine and any pharmacist or pharmaceutical supplier is authorized to dispense drugs to the Commissioner or the Commissioner's designee, without prescription, for carrying out the provisions of this section, notwithstanding any other provision of law" (excerpt from Title 11, Chapter 42, § 4209). State law allows for the dispensing of the drugs/chemicals for lethal injection to the state's department of corrections without a prescription. However, states are still subject to DEA regulation with respect to lethal injection drugs.

Controversy

Opposition
Opponents of lethal injection have voiced concerns that abuse, misuse and even criminal conduct is possible when there is not a proper chain of command and authority for the acquisition of death-inducing drugs.

Awareness
Opponents of lethal injection believe that it is not actually painless as practiced in the United States. Opponents argue that the thiopental is an ultrashort-acting barbiturate that may wear off (anesthesia awareness) and lead to consciousness and an uncomfortable death wherein the inmates are unable to express  discomfort because they have been rendered paralyzed by the paralytic agent.

Opponents point to the fact that sodium thiopental is typically used as an induction agent and is not used in the maintenance phase of surgery because of its short-acting nature. Following the administration of thiopental, pancuronium bromide, a paralytic agent, is given. Opponents argue that pancuronium bromide not only dilutes the thiopental, but, as it paralyzes the inmate, also prevents the inmate from expressing pain. Additional concerns have been raised over whether inmates are administered an appropriate amount of thiopental owing to the rapid redistribution of the drug out of the brain to other parts of the body.

Additionally, opponents argue that the method of administration also is flawed. They contend that as the personnel administering the lethal injection lack expertise in anesthesia, the risk of failure to induce unconsciousness is greatly increased. In reference to this issue, Jay Chapman, the creator of the American method, said, "It never occurred to me when we set this up that we'd have complete idiots administering the drugs". Also, opponents argue that the dose of sodium thiopental must be customized to each individual patient, and not restricted to a set protocol. Finally, they contend that remote administration may result in an increased risk that insufficient amounts of the lethal-injection drugs enter the inmate's bloodstream.

In summation, opponents argue that the effect of dilution or of improper administration of thiopental is that the inmate dies an agonizing death through suffocation due to the paralytic effects of pancuronium bromide and the intense burning sensation caused by potassium chloride.

Opponents of lethal injection, as currently practiced, argue that the procedure employed is designed to create the appearance of serenity and a painless death, rather than actually providing it. More specifically, opponents object to the use of pancuronium bromide, arguing that its use in lethal injection serves no useful purpose since the inmate is physically restrained. Therefore, the default function of pancuronium bromide would be to suppress the autonomic nervous system, specifically to stop breathing.

Research
In 2005, University of Miami researchers, in cooperation with the attorney representing death-row inmates from Virginia, published a research letter in the medical journal The Lancet. The article presented protocol information from Texas, Virginia, and North and South Carolina which showed that executioners had no anesthesia training, drugs were administered remotely with no monitoring for anesthesia, data were not recorded, and no peer review was done. Their analysis of toxicology reports from Arizona, Georgia, North and South Carolina showed that post mortem concentrations of thiopental in the blood were lower than that required for surgery in 43 of 49 executed inmates (88%), and that  21 (43%) inmates had concentrations consistent with awareness. This led the authors to conclude that a substantial probability existed that some of the inmates were aware and suffered extreme pain and distress during execution. The authors attributed the risk of consciousness among inmates to the lack of training and monitoring in the process, but carefully made no recommendations on how to alter the protocol or how to improve the process. Indeed, the authors conclude, "because participation of doctors in protocol design or execution is ethically prohibited, adequate anesthesia cannot be certain. Therefore, to prevent unnecessary cruelty and suffering, cessation and public review of lethal injections is warranted".

Paid expert consultants on both sides of the lethal-injection debate have found opportunity to criticize the 2005 Lancet article. Subsequent to the initial publication in the Lancet, three letters to the editor and a response from the authors extended the analysis. The issue of contention is whether thiopental, like many lipid-soluble drugs, may be redistributed from blood into tissues after death, effectively lowering thiopental concentrations over time, or whether thiopental may distribute from tissues into the blood, effectively increasing post mortem blood concentrations over time. Given the near absence of scientific, peer-reviewed data on the topic of thiopental post mortem pharmacokinetics, the controversy continues in the lethal-injection community and, in consequence, many legal challenges to lethal injection have not used the Lancet article.

In 2007, the same group that authored the Lancet study extended its study of the lethal-injection process through a critical examination of the pharmacology of the barbiturate thiopental. This study – published in the online journal PLOS Medicine – confirmed and extended the conclusions made in the original article and goes further to disprove the assertion that the lethal-injection process is painless.

To date, these two studies by the University of Miami team serve as the only critical peer-reviewed examination of the pharmacology of the lethal-injection process.

Cruel and unusual
On occasion, difficulties inserting the intravenous needles have also occurred, with personnel sometimes taking over half an hour to find a suitable vein. Typically, the difficulty is found in convicts with diabetes or a history of intravenous drug use. Opponents argue that excessive time taken to insert intravenous lines is tantamount to cruel and unusual punishment. In addition, opponents point to instances where the intravenous line has failed, or when adverse reactions to drugs or unnecessary delays have happened during the process of execution.

On December 13, 2006, Angel Nieves Diaz was not executed successfully in Florida using a standard lethal-injection dose. Diaz was 55 years old and had been sentenced to death for murder. Diaz did not succumb to the lethal dose even after 35 minutes, necessitating a second dose of drugs to complete the execution. At first, a prison spokesman denied Diaz had suffered pain and claimed the second dose was needed because Diaz had some sort of liver disease. After performing an autopsy, the medical examiner, Dr. William Hamilton, stated that Diaz's liver appeared normal, but that the needle had pierced through Diaz's vein into his flesh. The deadly chemicals had subsequently been injected into soft tissue rather than into the vein. Two days after the execution, then-Governor Jeb Bush suspended all executions in the state and appointed a commission "to consider the humanity and constitutionality of lethal injections." The ban was lifted by Governor Charlie Crist when he signed the death warrant for Mark Dean Schwab on July 18, 2007. On November 1, 2007, the Florida Supreme Court unanimously upheld the state's lethal-injection procedures.

A study published in 2007 in PLOS Medicine suggested that "the conventional view of lethal injection leading to an invariably peaceful and painless death is questionable".

The execution of Romell Broom was abandoned in Ohio on September 15, 2009, after prison officials failed to find a vein after two hours of trying on his arms, legs, hands, and ankle. This stirred up more intense debate in the United States about lethal injection. Broom's execution was later rescheduled for March 2022, but he died in 2020 before the sentence could be carried out.

Dennis McGuire was executed in Lucasville, Ohio, on January 17, 2014. According to reporters, McGuire's execution took more than 20 minutes, and he was gasping for air for 10–13 minutes after the drugs had been administered. It was the first use of a new drug combination which was introduced in Ohio after the European Union banned sodium thiopental exports. This reignited criticism of the conventional three-drug method.

Clayton Lockett died of a heart attack during a failed execution attempt on April 29, 2014, at Oklahoma State Penitentiary in McAlester, Oklahoma. Lockett was administered an untested mixture of drugs that had not previously been used for executions in the U.S. He survived for 43 minutes before being pronounced dead. Lockett convulsed and spoke during the process and attempted to rise from the execution table 14 minutes into the procedure, despite having been declared unconscious.

Lethal injection, by design, is outwardly ambiguous with respect to what can be seen by witnesses. The 8th amendment of the US constitution proscribes cruel punishment but only the punished can accurately gauge the experience of cruelty. In execution, the inmate is unable to be a witness to their own execution, so it falls on the assembled witnesses to decide. Eyewitnesses to execution report very different observations, and these differences range from an opinion that the execution was painless to comments that the execution was highly problematic. Post mortem examinations of inmates executed by lethal injection have revealed a common finding of heavily congested lungs consistent with pulmonary edema. The occurrence of pulmonary edema found at autopsy raises the question about the actual cruelty of lethal injection. If pulmonary edema occurs as a consequence of lethal injection, the experience of death may be more akin to drowning than simply the painless death described by lethal injection proponents. Pulmonary edema can only occur if the inmate has heart function and cannot occur after death.

European Union export ban
Due to its use for executions in the US, the UK introduced a ban on the export of sodium thiopental in December 2010, after it was established that no European supplies to the US were being used for any other purpose. The restrictions were based on "the European Union Torture Regulation (including licensing of drugs used in execution by lethal injection)". From December 21, 2011, the European Union extended trade restrictions to prevent the export of certain medicinal products for capital punishment, stating, "The Union disapproves of capital punishment in all circumstances and works towards its universal abolition".

Support

Commonality
The combination of a barbiturate induction agent and a nondepolarizing paralytic agent is used in thousands of anesthetics every day. Supporters of the death penalty argue that unless anesthesiologists have been wrong for the past 40 years, the use of pentothal and pancuronium is safe and effective. In fact, potassium is given in heart bypass surgery to induce cardioplegia. Therefore, the combination of these three drugs is still in use today. Supporters of the death penalty speculate that the designers of the lethal-injection protocols intentionally used the same drugs as are used in everyday surgery to avoid controversy. The only modification is that a massive coma-inducing dose of barbiturates is given. In addition, similar protocols have been used in countries that support euthanasia or physician-assisted suicide.

Anesthesia awareness
Thiopental is a rapid and effective drug for inducing unconsciousness, since it causes loss of consciousness upon a single circulation through the brain due to its high lipophilicity. Only a few other drugs, such as methohexital, etomidate, or propofol, have the capability to induce anesthesia so rapidly. (Narcotics such as fentanyl are inadequate as induction agents for anesthesia.) Supporters argue that since the thiopental is given at a much higher dose than for medically induced coma protocols, it is effectively impossible for the condemned to wake up.

Anesthesia awareness occurs when general anesthesia is inadequately maintained, for a number of reasons. Typically, anesthesia is 'induced' with an intravenous drug, but 'maintained' with an inhaled anesthetic given by the anesthesiologist or nurse-anesthetist (note that there are several other methods for safely and effectively maintaining anesthesia). Barbiturates are used only for induction of anesthesia and although these drugs rapidly and reliably induce anesthesia,  wear off quickly. A neuromuscular-blocking drug may then be given to cause paralysis which facilitates intubation, although this is not always required. The anesthesiologist or nurse-anesthetist is responsible for ensuring that the maintenance technique (typically inhalational) is started soon after induction to prevent the patient from waking up.

General anesthesia is not maintained with barbiturate drugs because they are so short-acting. An induction dose of thiopental wears off after a few minutes because the thiopental redistributes from the brain to the rest of the body very quickly. Also thiopental has a long half-life and needs time for the drug to be eliminated from the body. If a very large initial dose is given, little or no redistribution takes place because the body is saturated with the drug; thus recovery of consciousness requires the drug to be eliminated from the body. Because this process is not only slow (taking many hours or days), but also unpredictable in duration, barbiturates are unsatisfactory for the maintenance of anesthesia.

Thiopental has a half-life around 11.5 hours (but the action of a single dose is terminated within a few minutes by redistribution of the drug from the brain to peripheral tissues) and the long-acting barbiturate phenobarbital has a half-life around 4–5 days. In contrast, the inhaled anesthetics have extremely short half-lives and allow the patient to wake up rapidly and predictably after surgery.

The average time to death once a lethal-injection protocol has been started is about 7–11 minutes. Because it takes only about 30 seconds for the thiopental to induce anesthesia, 30–45 seconds for the pancuronium to cause paralysis, and about 30 seconds for the potassium to stop the heart, death can theoretically be attained in as little as 90 seconds. Given that it takes time to administer the drug, time for the line to flush itself, time for the change of the drug being administered, and time to ensure that death has occurred, the whole procedure takes about 7–11 minutes. Procedural aspects in pronouncing death also contribute to delay, so the condemned is usually pronounced dead within 10–20 minutes of starting the drugs. Supporters of the death penalty say that a huge dose of thiopental, which is between 14 and 20 times the anesthetic-induction dose and which has the potential to induce a medical coma lasting 60 hours, could never wear off in only 10–20 minutes.

Dilution effect
Death-penalty supporters state that the claim that pancuronium dilutes the sodium thiopental dose is erroneous. Supporters argue that pancuronium and thiopental are commonly used together in everyday surgery and that if there were a dilution effect, it would be a known drug interaction.

Drug interactions are a complex topic. Simplistically, drug interactions can be classified as either synergistic or inhibitory interactions. In addition, drug interactions can occur directly at the site of action through common pathways, or indirectly through metabolism of the drug in the liver or through elimination in the kidney. Pancuronium and thiopental have different sites of action, one in the brain and one at the neuromuscular junction. Since the half-life of thiopental is 11.5 hours, the metabolism of the drugs is not an issue when dealing with the short time frame in lethal injections. The only other plausible interpretation would be a direct one, or one in which the two compounds interact with each other. Supporters of the death penalty argue that this theory does not hold true. They state that even if the 100 mg of pancuronium directly prevented 500 mg of thiopental from working, sufficient thiopental to induce coma would be present for 50 hours. In addition, if this interaction did occur, then the pancuronium would be incapable of causing paralysis.

Supporters of the death penalty state that the claim that the pancuronium prevents the thiopental from working, yet is still capable of causing paralysis, is not based on any scientific evidence and is a drug interaction that has never before been documented for any other drugs.

Single drug

Terminally ill patients in Oregon who have requested physician-assisted suicide have received lethal doses of barbiturates. The protocol has been highly effective in producing a painless death, but the time required to cause death can be prolonged. Some patients have taken days to die, and a few patients have actually survived the process and have regained consciousness up to three days after taking the lethal dose. In a California legal proceeding addressing the issue of the lethal-injection cocktail being "cruel and unusual," state authorities said that the time to death following a single injection of a barbiturate could be as much as 45 minutes.

Barbiturate overdoses typically cause death by depression of the respiratory center, but the effect is variable. Some patients may have complete cessation of respiratory drive, whereas others may only have depression of respiratory function. In addition, cardiac activity can last for a long time after cessation of respiration. Since death is pronounced after asystole and given that the expectation is for a rapid death in lethal injection, multiple drugs are required, specifically potassium chloride to stop the heart. In fact, in the case of Clarence Ray Allen, a second dose of potassium chloride was required to attain asystole.

Stockpiling of drugs
A 2017 study found that four U.S. states that allow capital punishment are stockpiling lethal-injection drugs that are in short supply and may be needed for life-saving medical procedures elsewhere.

See also

Capital punishment by country
Drug injection
Execution methods
Execution chamber
List of people executed by lethal injection

References

Additional references

External links
Death Penalty Worldwide, by Cornell Law School – Academic database on every death penalty country in the world
Lethalinjection.org, by UC Berkeley School of Law – Web-based information clearinghouse on lethal injection

 
Execution methods